"Taylor, the Latte Boy" is a contemporary song by Marcy Heisler and Zina Goldrich.  It is based on their experience with a barista at Starbucks.  It is best known for being performed by Kristin Chenoweth on her album As I AmHutton, Mary Ellyn (January 26, 2005). "Pops, Chenoweth wow NYC with their 'classics'", The Cincinnati Post, p. C8. but was first released by Susan Egan on her 2004 album Coffee House.

Story
The song details the infatuation the narrator has for the coffee boy at Starbucks.  She introduces herself and takes various actions to be signs of his affection. She even goes to the extent of saying "I love him, I love him, I love him."

Regarding the lyrics, Heisler said, "So many of the stories come from my own experience, my own life, I don't think that much about it... A singer will call and say, 'What was the motivation?' I went into a coffee shop and met a cute boy. No Brechtian overtones."

References 

American songs